Nicholas Alexander Kahl (April 10, 1879 – July 13, 1959) was a Major League Baseball second baseman. His minor league baseball career spanned fourteen seasons, from  until .

Sources

Major League Baseball second basemen
Cleveland Naps players
Nevada Lunatics players
Kansas City Blue Stockings players
Colorado Springs Millionaires players
Leavenworth Old Soldiers players
Columbus Senators players
Lima Cigarmakers players
Grand Rapids Wolverines players
Grand Rapids Raiders players
Terre Haute Miners players
Zanesville Potters players
Quincy Infants players
Quincy Old Soldiers players
Quincy Gems players
Baseball players from Illinois
People from Randolph County, Illinois
1879 births
1959 deaths